Professor Ivan Mitev Ivanov (4 October 1924 – 15 April 2006) was a Bulgarian pediatrician and cardio rheumatologist who discovered the sixth heart tone, called the tone of Mitev.

Notes 

 Article about the Bulgarian discoveries in medicine
 Interview with Ivan Mitev
 Conversation with the son of Ivan Mitev - Vanyo Mitev
 Short biography (in Bulgarian)

1924 births
2006 deaths
Bulgarian pediatricians
Bulgarian cardiologists